Cryptocoryne auriculata is a plant species belonging to the Araceae genus Cryptocoryne.

Distribution
Borneo (Sarawak) and Philippines ?

In nature, C. auriculata grows between stones, which indicates that the water is running fast in the rainy season.

Description
Small ovate leaves up to 2.5 inches (6.5 cm) and 1.5 inches broad (4 cm) with a sharp tip and cordate base, on stems of equal length to the leaves. Rather thick and stiff in texture. In colour the leaves are a dark olive-green.

Cultivation
Considered difficult in cultivation. Only occasionally imported and often seems to just fade away. Will grow emerse and submerse and is reputed to withstand hard water. Needs an aquarium with clean water and a good substrate.

Propagates well by runners.

References

 Jacobsen, N., 1985. The Cryptocoryne (Araceae) of Borneo. Nord.J.Bot. 5 : 31-50.
 Rataj, K., 1975. Revision of the genus Cryptocoryne Fischer. Studie CSAV, c.3.Praha.
 Rataj, K. & Horeman, T.J., 1977. Aquarium Plants. TFH Publ, USA.
 Ridley, H.N., 1905. The Aroids of Borneo. J.Str.Br.Roy.As.Soc. 44 : 169-171.

External links
 Cryptocoryne auriculata

auriculata
Aquatic plants